Mosspark railway station serves the Pollok and Cardonald areas of Glasgow, Scotland.

The Mosspark district after which it is named is more closely served by Corkerhill railway station.

History 
The station was opened as Mosspark West by the LMS on 1 March 1934. There was however no Mosspark East. British Rail renamed the station Mosspark on 6 May 1974. On 10 January 1983, the station was closed to passengers, although the line was retained for freight services.

Services 

Currently the service pattern Mondays-Saturdays is:

 2tph to Glasgow Central
 2tph to Paisley  Canal

There is one train per hour in each direction on Sundays.

References

Notes

Sources 

 
 
 

Railway stations in Glasgow
SPT railway stations
Railway stations in Great Britain closed in 1983
Railway stations in Great Britain opened in 1990
Reopened railway stations in Great Britain
Railway stations served by ScotRail
Railway stations in Great Britain opened in 1934
Former London, Midland and Scottish Railway stations